Holland Park Avenue is a street located in the Royal Borough of Kensington and Chelsea, in west central London. The street runs from Notting Hill Gate in the east to the Holland Park Roundabout in the west, forms a part of the old west road connecting London with Oxford and the west of England, and is designated part of the A402 road.

Holland Park Avenue's present design was laid out in the 19th century. Despite being a busy traffic artery, the street is elegantly lined with large well-established plane trees and boasts attractive terraces of large Victorian townhouses, as well as numerous high-end shops and restaurants. 

Politically, Holland Park Avenue is located at the boundaries of four CAS wards: Norland, Holland, Pembridge, and Campden. 

To the south of the street is Holland Park, one of London's largest and most romantic parks, featuring a Japanese garden, opera house, and numerous peacocks.

History

The street was largely rural until the 19th century. Most of the surrounding neighbourhood was formerly the grounds of the Jacobean mansion Holland House. In the later decades of the 19th century the owners of the house sold off land for residential development, and the district which evolved took its name from the house. Holland Park was for the most part comfortably upper middle class when originally developed and in recent decades has gone further upmarket. 

Of the 19th century residential developments of the area, one of the most architecturally interesting is The Royal Crescent, designed in 1839, and located just north of Holland Park Avenue. Clearly inspired by its older namesake in Bath, it differs from the Bath crescent in that it is not strictly a true crescent but rather two quadrant terraces each terminated by a circular bow in the Regency style. Architecturally, Royal Crescent incorporates parts of the north side of Holland Park Avenue and was designed by planner Robert Cantwell. The stucco fronted crescent and its neighbours on Holland Park Avenue are painted white, in the style of the many Nash terraces which can be seen elsewhere in London's smarter residential areas. Today many of these four storey houses have been converted to flats, though a few remain as private houses.  The Royal Crescent, and the terraces on Holland Park Avenue which adjoin it, are listed Grade II*.

Holland Park Avenue now forms the main artery for one of the most expensive residential districts in London or indeed anywhere in the world, with large houses regularly listed for sale at well over ten million pounds sterling. A number of countries maintain embassies in the neighbourhood, with the Embassy of Turkmenistan located on the road itself.

Transport links 
Holland Park Avenue is the site of Holland Park tube station which is on the Central line, and at its western end, across Holland Park Roundabout, is Shepherd's Bush tube station, also on the Central line. The avenue is also on the route of Transport for London bus routes 31, 94, 148 and 228 as well as night bus route N207 and the 24-hour Oxford Tube coach service. There are several bus stops along both sides of Holland Park Avenue and although there are no taxi ranks on the street itself it is easy to hail a Black Cab almost anywhere.

See also 
James McBey (plaque commemorating him at 1 Holland Park Avenue)
Caroline Benn (plaque commemorating her in Holland Park Avenue)
Eugen Sandow (plaque commemorating him at 161 Holland Park Avenue)
P.D. James (plaque commemorating her at 58 Holland Park Avenue)

References and sources
References

Sources
 A History of London, Robert Gray, Hutchinson, 1978, 

Holland Park
Shopping streets in London
Streets in the Royal Borough of Kensington and Chelsea